Ormancık is a village in Anamur district of Mersin Province, Turkey. It is situated in the forests of Toros Mountains to the east of Dragon creek. The population of Ormancık is 484  as of 2011. It is planned that a part of the village (along with Akine, Çaltıbükü and Sarıağaç) will be submerged in Alaköprü Dam reservoir.

References

Villages in Anamur District